Satsunaigawa Dam  is a gravity dam located in Hokkaido Prefecture in Japan. The dam is used for flood control, irrigation, water supply and power production. The catchment area of the dam is 117.7 km2. The dam impounds about 170  ha of land when full and can store 54000 thousand cubic meters of water. The construction of the dam was started on 1981 and completed in 1998.

References

Dams in Hokkaido